Morris Head is an ice-covered headland marking the seaward end of Hagey Ridge and the northeastern extremity of the McDonald Heights, on the coast of Marie Byrd Land, Antarctica. The headland was photographed from aircraft of the United States Antarctic Service on December 18, 1940, and was mapped by the United States Geological Survey from surveys and U.S. Navy air photos, 1959–65. It was named by the Advisory Committee on Antarctic Names for Lloyd Morris, U.S. Navy, Chief Quartermaster and senior member of the bathythermograph team aboard  in exploring this coast in 1961–62.

References

Headlands of Marie Byrd Land